Vidima is a village located in the Chümoukedima District of Nagaland and is a suburb of Chümoukedima, the district headquarters.

Demographics
Vidima is situated in the Chümoukedima District of Nagaland. As per the Population Census 2011, there are a total 121 households in Vidima. The total population of Vidima is 562.

See also
Chümoukedima District

References

 Villages in Chümoukedima district